After the resignation of J. Jayalalithaa as Chief Minister, the Governor appointed O. Panneerselvam as Chief Minister and 23 more Ministers on 21 September 2001. He resigned as Jayalalithaa returned to power.

Cabinet ministers

References

Further reading 

 

All India Anna Dravida Munnetra Kazhagam
2001 in Indian politics
P
2000s in Tamil Nadu
2001 establishments in Tamil Nadu
2002 disestablishments in India
Cabinets established in 2001
Cabinets disestablished in 2002